The 1934 Nevada Wolf Pack football team was an American football team that represented the University of Nevada in the Far Western Conference (FWC) during the 1934 college football season. In their third season under head coach Brick Mitchell, the team compiled a 1–7–1 record (0–4–1 FWC) and finished last in the conference.

Vic Carroll played tackle for the 1934 team. He later played 12 seasons in the National Football League (NFL) for the Boston/Washington Redskins and the New York Giants.

Schedule

References

Nevada
Nevada Wolf Pack football seasons
Nevada Wolf Pack football